Asura cuneifera is a moth of the family Erebidae. It is found on Java, Borneo, Peninsular Malaysia and Sumatra. The habitat consists of various lowland forest types, including heath forests and lower montane forests.

References

cuneifera
Moths described in 1862
Moths of Asia